The Cláudio Santoro National Theater (Teatro Nacional Cláudio Santoro) is a multi-theater building in Brasília, Brazil. It was designed by Oscar Niemeyer in the Modern architectural style. Construction began on July 30, 1960, and the building was completed in 1966. Built in the shape of a truncated pyramid, it is the largest building in Brasilia designed by Niemeyer specifically for the arts. The building was closed for renovation in 1976, and was reopened on April 21, 1981.

The National Theater is operated by Secretary of Culture of the Federal District and is home to three venues; the 60-seat Alberto Nepomuceno theater, the 407-seat Martins Pena theater, and the 1,407 seat Villa-Lobos theater. The complex also includes an exhibition gallery that is accessible to the public.

The Theater has been under renovation for more than two years and remains closed to the public.

History

Construction of the theater was started on July 30, 1960. The building was structurally complete by January 30, 1961, but construction was then interrupted until early 1966. The Martins-Pena theater was opened on April 21, 1966, and was used for ten years until it was closed on September 4, 1976 during completion of the complex.

Construction was completed by March 1979, and the Villa-Lobos theatre was opened with a concert conducted by Cláudio Santoro. The Martins-Pena theater was reopened on March 7, and the Alberto Nepomuceno theatre was opened on March 8. On December 1, 1979, the entire complex was closed again to complete renovations, and construction began on an annex which would include offices, rehearsal rooms, and galleries.

The complex was reopened on April 21, 1981, and an annex was opened on June 24, 1981. The theatre was renamed Claudio Santoro National Theater on September 1, 1989, in honor of the Brazilian composer and violinist.

Renovation, closure to the public and other problems 
Since January 2014, the National Theater began a long renovation process, not yet completed because of budgetary constraints and the lack of governmental prioritization concerning the matter.

Also, due to the low stream of people in the immediate vicinity of the Theater and to the absence of security and surveillance, the external part of the building has become a spot for drug use.

Guilherme Reis, current Secretary of Culture of the Federal District, said in a newspaper article that "there is no expectation of reopening the area any time soon".

Notes

External links

360 degree interactive panorama of main entrance, and lobby of the Villa-Lobos theater

Buildings and structures completed in 1966
Buildings and structures in Brasília
Oscar Niemeyer buildings
Theatres in Brasília
Tourist attractions in Brasília